The men's 100 metres at the 2022 Commonwealth Games, as part of the athletics programme, took place at the Alexander Stadium from 2 and 3 August 2022.

Yupun Abeykoon won the bronze medal after finishing the race in 10.14 seconds. Abeykoon also became the first Sri Lankan to win a Commonwealth Games medal in athletics after 24 years since Sriyani Kulawansa and Sugath Thilakaratne's medal feats at the 1998 Commonwealth Games. Abeykoon also became the first Sri Lankan to win a Commonwealth Games medal in either men's and women's 100m event. During the heats, Abeykoon managed to set an all-time fastest ever timing in the heats, after finishing with a timing of 10.06 seconds. The previous record in 100m men's heats record was held by Canada's Glenroy Gilbert who had finished his heat with a timing of 10.10 seconds during the 1994 Commonwealth Games.

Records
Prior to this competition, the existing world and Games records were as follows:

Schedule
The schedule is as follows: 

All times are United Kingdom time (UTC+1)

Results

First round
The first round consisted of ten heats. The two fastest competitors per heat (plus the seven fastest non-automatic qualifiers) advanced to the semifinals.
Heat 1

Heat 2

Heat 3

Heat 4

Heat 5

Heat 6

Heat 7

Heat 8

Heat 9

Heat 10

Semifinals
Qualification for Final (2+2)
Semifinal 1

Semifinal 2

Semifinal 3

Final

References

Men's 100 metres
2022